Mars Two, Mars II, Mars 2 or variant, may refer to:

 Mars II (Deimos), the second moon of Mars
 Mars 2, the Soviet spaceprobe for Mars
 HMS Mars (1746), the second ship named HMS Mars
 , the second ship named USS Mars
 the second volume of Fuyumi Soryo's Mars (manga)
 MARS II / LRU / MLRS-I, a European variant of the M270 Multiple Launch Rocket System

See also
 Mars (disambiguation)
 Mars 2M (disambiguation)
 Mars 2MV-4 (disambiguation)